The 2018 World RX of Latvia was the ninth round of the fifth season of the FIA World Rallycross Championship. The event was held at Biķernieku Kompleksā Sporta Bāze, in the Latvian capital of Riga.

Supercar 

Source

Heats

Semi-finals 

 Semi-Final 1

 Semi-Final 2

Final

Standings after the event 

Source

 Note: Only the top five positions are included.

References 

|- style="text-align:center"
|width="35%"|Previous race:2018 World RX of France
|width="40%"|FIA World Rallycross Championship2018 season
|width="35%"|Next race:2018 World RX of USA
|- style="text-align:center"
|width="35%"|Previous race:2017 World RX of Latvia
|width="40%"|World RX of Latvia
|width="35%"|Next race:2019 World RX of Latvia
|- style="text-align:center"

Latvia
World RX
2018 in Latvian sport